Kerc may refer to :

 the Crimean city Kerch (Ancient Bosporus)
 the Hungarian name for Cârța, Sibiu, Romania